Claire Hamilton (born 31 January 1989) is a Scottish curler. She formerly played lead for the rink skipped by Eve Muirhead. Representing Scotland, they were the 2013 World Champions and representing Team GB, they were the 2014 Olympic bronze medallists.

Hamilton was born in Lockerbie, Scotland and was educated at Lockerbie Academy and the University of Strathclyde, where she studied pharmacy. She was a member of the Anna Sloan rink that won a gold medal for Great Britain at the 2011 Winter Universiade,  playing as the team's alternate. In March 2011, she played third for Sloan at the 2011 World Championships, along with Vicki Adams, Rhiann MacLeod and Eve Muirhead as alternate. They finished 9th.

Sloan joined forces with Muirhead after that season, with Hamilton becoming the team's lead and Adams playing in second position. They had quick success, winning the gold medal at the 2011 European Curling Championships in Moscow. However, they were not as successful at the 2012 World Championships, placing 6th.

Team Muirhead won gold medals at the 2013 World Curling Championships in Riga, Latvia, with Lauren Gray as alternate. Representing Great Britain, they won a bronze medal at the 2014 Winter Olympics in Sochi, Russia.

In May 2014 Hamilton announced that she was leaving Eve Muirhead's rink. Shortly afterwards she took up cycling, and took a silver medal in the individual pursuit at the Scottish National Track Championships in October 2014.

References

External links

Scottish female curlers
British female curlers
1989 births
Living people
World curling champions
Curlers at the 2014 Winter Olympics
Olympic curlers of Great Britain
Olympic bronze medallists for Great Britain
Olympic medalists in curling
Medalists at the 2014 Winter Olympics
Scottish female cyclists
European curling champions
Universiade medalists in curling
Universiade gold medalists for Great Britain
Competitors at the 2011 Winter Universiade